Cheyne is both a surname of Scottish origin which means "oak tree", and a given name. Notable people with the name include:

Surname:
Bob Cheyne
Rob Cheyne
John Cheyne (speaker) Speaker of the House of Commons (14th century)
John Cheyne, Baron Cheyne (–1499), English courtier and hostage after the Treaty of Picquigny (1475)
John Cheyne (physician) (1777–1836), British physician, surgeon and author
George Cheyne (physician) (1671–1743), physician and medical writer
Sir Reginald Cheyne, (fl. 13thc.), Lord Chamberlain of Scotland
Thomas Cheney (Cheyne) (–1558), Lord Warden of the Cinque Ports
Thomas Kelly Cheyne (1841–1915), English divine and Biblical critic
Sir William Cheyne, 1st Baronet (1852–1932), British surgeon and bacteriologist who pioneered the use of antiseptical surgical methods in the United Kingdom
John Cheyne (1905), British lawyer, see Bannatyne v Overtoun
Alec Cheyne (1907–1983), Scottish footballer (Aberdeen, Chelsea, Nîmes, Colchester United, Scotland)
William Cheyne (footballer) (1912–1988), also known as Andy Cheyne, Scottish footballer (Rangers)

Given name:
Cheyne Coates, Australian dance music and pop singer
Cheyne (singer), American dance singer

See also
Cheyne baronets, descended from the surgeon and bacteriologist Sir William Cheyne (1852–1932)
Cheyne Walk
Cheyne–Stokes respiration, a medical condition
Shane (disambiguation)

References

Surnames of Scottish origin